The Castello or Castle of Felino is a moated castle in a forested grove near the town of Felino, province of Parma, region of Emilia Romagna, Italy. 

A castle structure was first erected by the Marquis Luppone by 890. It underwent further fortification, specially by the end of te 14th century while in possession of the Rossi family. However in 1483, it was captured by Ludovico Sforza, and he nearly had all the structure razed. It had many owners over the following centuries, including Pietro di Roano, who sold it to Galeazzo Pallavicini in 1505. Count Cosimo Masi purchased it in 1600, but it was expropriated in 1612 by Ranuccio I Farnese. The Farnese granted the castle in 1632 to Girolamo Rho. The Lampugnani family, who had acquired the castle in 1650, ceded the castle to the Marquis Guglielmo du Tillot, who left the property to the bishops of Parma, who owned the property until 1935. A guidebook from 1903 describes the structure as: the walls are still firmly in place, the interior of which has however lost all ancient character and threatens ruin In 1974 the castle was bought by the current owners.

The castle today preserves intact the fifteenth-century square layout with robust and tall walls and large bastioned parapets that join four corner towers. A chapel and an oratory were added to San Pietro, still existing, completely frescoed with coats of arms of various families. Prisons were built in the basement. It now houses a hotel and restaurant and now used for cultural and private events and meetings. It also houses a museum of Salami, a celebrated local product.

References

 

Castles in Emilia-Romagna
Buildings and structures completed in the 10th century
Buildings and structures in the Province of Parma
Museums in Emilia-Romagna